John Dallas Cecil Ford (September 22, 1894 – March 8, 1947) was an American Negro league pitcher in the 1910s.

A native of Ambler, Pennsylvania, Ford played for the Hilldale Club in 1917. He died in 1947 at age 52.

References

External links
 and Seamheads

1894 births
1947 deaths
Place of death missing
Hilldale Club players
Baseball pitchers
Baseball players from Pennsylvania
People from Ambler, Pennsylvania
20th-century African-American sportspeople